Luostari Pechenga is a former military air base located just two kilometres of former Ylä-Luostari village, adjacent to the village developed around Petsamo (Petshenga) Monastery, (in Finnish language: Luostari = Monastery)  Yuri Gagarin served here after having graduated from the Orenburg Pilot's School (1957–1960).

The base was used by the 258 OVE (258th Independent Helicopter Squadron) flying Mil Mi-24 (NATO: Hind), Mil Mi-35 (NATO: Monsoon), and Mil Mi-8 (NATO: Hip) helicopters between 1967 and 1994.

As of August 2019, it is reported as closed.

References

Russian Air Force bases
Soviet Air Force bases
Buildings and structures in Murmansk Oblast